6th Brigade may refer to:

Argentina
6th Mountain Infantry Brigade (Argentina)

Australia
6th Brigade (Australia)

Austria
6th Brigade (Austria)

Belarus
6th Separate Special-Police Brigade

Canada
6th Canadian Infantry Brigade

France
6th Armoured Brigade (France)

India
 6th Indian Brigade in the First World War
 6th Indian Cavalry Brigade in the First World War
 6th Indian Infantry Brigade in the Second World War

Israel
Etzioni Brigade

New Zealand
6th Infantry Brigade (New Zealand)

Norway
6th Brigade (Norway)

Poland
6th Airborne Brigade (Poland)

Romania
6th Anti-aircraft Missiles Brigade (Romania)

Russia
 6th Separate Tank Brigade (Russia)

South Africa
 6th Infantry Brigade (South Africa)

Ukraine
6th Mechanized Brigade (Ukraine)

United Kingdom
6th Airlanding Brigade (United Kingdom)
6th Armoured Brigade (United Kingdom)
6th Cavalry Brigade (United Kingdom)
6th Guards Brigade
6th Infantry Brigade (United Kingdom)
6th Mounted Brigade (United Kingdom)
 Artillery Brigades
 6th (Howitzer) Brigade Royal Field Artillery 
 VI Brigade, Royal Horse Artillery